The State Emblem of the Soviet Union was adopted in 1923 and was used until the dissolution of the Soviet Union in 1991. Although it technically is an emblem rather than a coat of arms, since it does not follow traditional heraldic rules, in Russian it is called , the word used for a traditional coat of arms. 

It was the first state insignia created in the style known as socialist heraldry, a style also seen in emblems of other socialist countries such as East Germany and the People's Republic of China.

History

Creation
In the autumn of 1922, the Commission for the Development of Soviet Symbolics began its work in Goznak. In those days, compositions of the first Soviet brands and banknotes were created. On 10 January 1923, the Presidium of the Central Executive Committee of the USSR established a commission for the development of the state emblem and flag. At the same time, the CEC defined the main elements of the state symbols of the union: the sun, the sickle and hammer, the motto "Proletarians of all countries, unite!". 

In February 1923, the order for the creation of the coat of arms was handed over to Goznak. The artists of Goznak presented their variants, sketches of the projects of the coat of arms of artists DS Golyadkin, Ya.B. Dreyer, N.N. Kochury, V.D. Kupriyanov, P. Rumyantsev, AG Yakimchenko, I. Shadra. An interesting project was presented by artist K.I. Dunin-Borkovsky - he, as an adherent of classical heraldry, represented the coat of arms of the USSR as a heraldic shield with a sickle and a hammer.

Rejected proposals

Successful proposals 
The project by the head of the artistic and reproduction department of Goznak, V. N. Adrianov, is very close to the design of the officially approved state emblem of the Soviet Union. He suggested that an image of the globe should be included in the coat of arms, to represent membership of the Soviet Union being open to all nations of the world. 

On 28 June 1923, he replaced the previously planned monogram "СССР" with a red star at the top of the proposed emblem.

Approval 
The design of the successful proposed emblem was redrawn by Ivan Dubasov. In his first draft, slogans were placed on a red ribbon covering the lower part of the coat of arms. Then it was decided to place mottos in 6 languages on the tape interceptions.

First version (1923–1936)
The project of the first version of the state emblem was accepted on 6 July 1923 by the 2nd session of the Central Executive Committee (CIK) and the version was completed on 22 September of that year. This design was fixed in the 1924 Soviet Constitution: "The State Emblem of the USSR is composed of a sickle and a hammer on a globe depicted in the rays of the sun and framed by ears of wheat, with the inscription "proletarians of the world, unite!" in six languages—Russian, Ukrainian, Belarusian, Georgian, Armenian, Azerbaijani, with the Russian inscription in the centre. At the top of the Emblem is a five-pointed star."

The emblem was created by Vladimir Adrianov and finished by Ivan Dubasov. In 1931, Tajik was added after the formation of the Tajik SSR in 1929.

Second version (1936–1946)
According to the 1936 Soviet Constitution, the USSR consisted of eleven republics. Hence the major new version's difference from the previous one was eleven ribbons bearing USSR State Motto inscriptions in eleven languages. The languages added were Turkmen, Uzbek, Kazakh, Kyrgyz and Tajik.

Third version (1946–1956)

The number of republics in the USSR became 16 after the USSR entered World War II and annexed the Baltic states, Western Ukraine and Finnish Karelia in 1939–40, before Germany's invasion began in June 1941, but the state emblem was changed to reflect this only after the end of the war. By a Decision of Presidium of the Supreme Soviet of the USSR on 26 June 1946, all 16 constituent republics were represented on the emblem. The USSR State Motto was inscribed on 16 ribbons in 16 languages. Inscriptions in Azerbaijani, Turkmen, Uzbek, Tajik, Kazakh, Kyrgyz languages were updated due to the transfer from Latin to Cyrillic script of the respective languages within the USSR. Also, several language from newly annexed republics were added: Estonian, Latvian, Lithuanian, Romanian Cyrillic (Moldavian), and Finnish.

Fourth and final version (1956–1991)

In 1956, the Karelo-Finnish SSR was demoted into the Karelo-Finnish ASSR and incorporated into the Russian SFSR, and soon this was reflected on the USSR state emblem. By a decision of the Presidium of the Supreme Soviet of the USSR on 12 September 1956, the ribbon bearing the USSR State Motto in Finnish was removed.

A minor change in the Belarusian inscription was a decision of the Presidium of the Supreme Soviet of the USSR on 1 April 1958.

Inscriptions on the ribbons (which are translated into English as "Proletarians of the world, unite!") are as follows:

The coat of arms continued to appear after the dissolution of the Soviet Union even in Soviet ruble banknotes until 1994 when many post-Soviet states began to issue its own currencies. Public usage of the Soviet emblem formally ended in 2002 when Russia and other former republics ceased issuing Soviet passports. It continues to appear in many public places within Russian territory, especially after the 2022 Russian invasion of Ukraine.

Description
The state emblem shows the traditional Soviet emblems of the Hammer and Sickle and the Red Star over a globe, and two wreaths of emmer wheat covered by "Workers of the world, unite!" in the official languages of the Soviet Republics, in the reverse order they were mentioned in the Soviet Constitution.

Each Soviet Republic (SSR) and Autonomous Soviet Republic (ASSR) had its own coat of arms, largely modeled after the state emblem of the Soviet Union.

Gallery

See also

Emblems of the Soviet Republics
State Quality Mark of the USSR
Flag of the Soviet Union
Emblem of the Russian Soviet Federative Socialist Republic
Coat of arms of Russia
National Emblem of the People's Republic of China
National emblem of East Germany

Notes

References

Soviet Union

National symbols of the Soviet Union
Soviet Union
Soviet Union
Soviet Union
Soviet Union
Soviet Union
Soviet Union
Soviet Union